Kharbal is a village in Emamzadeh Jafar Rural District, in the Central District of Gachsaran County, Kohgiluyeh and Boyer-Ahmad Province, Iran. At the 2006 census, its population was 92, in 24 families.

References 

Populated places in Gachsaran County